Chhachi, Chacchī, or Chachhī is a dialect of Hindko spoken in the northwestern parts of Punjab, Pakistan. Grierson classified it within his "North-Western Lahndā" group, whereas Shackle considers it part of Hindko "proper", alongside Ghebī and Avāṅkārī.

References

Bibliography 

Languages of Punjab, Pakistan
Punjabi dialects
Attock District